Masa podrida are traditional Filipino shortbread cookies made from flour, salt, baking powder, brown sugar, shortening, and eggs. It has a dry crumbly texture similar to half-moon cookies. The name comes from Spanish for "rotten dough". Masa podrida are typically eaten with coffee and other hot drinks.

See also
Puto seco
Uraro
Half-moon cookie
List of cookies

References 

Philippine cuisine
Shortbread